The Chalone AVA is an American Viticultural Area in the Monterey and San Benito counties of California, located in the Gabilan Mountains east of Soledad.  The  region is named for the nearby Chalone peaks.  The region has limestone and decomposed granite soil.

See also 
 California wine

References 

American Viticultural Areas of California
Gabilan Range
Geography of Monterey County, California
Geography of San Benito County, California
American Viticultural Areas
1982 establishments in California